Parathesis congesta is a species of plant in the family Primulaceae. It is endemic to El Salvador.  It is threatened by habitat loss.

References

congesta
Vulnerable plants
Endemic flora of El Salvador
Taxonomy articles created by Polbot